The 2017 Ohio Valley Conference men's basketball tournament was the conference tournament for the Ohio Valley Conference. The tournament was held March 1–4, 2017 at Nashville Municipal Auditorium in Nashville, Tennessee. Jacksonville State defeated UT Martin, 66–55, in championship game to win the tournament and earn the conference's automatic bid to the NCAA tournament.

Seeds
Only the top eight teams in the conference qualified for the Tournament. The No. 1 and No. 2 seeds went to the division champions. The No. 1 and No. 2 seeds also received double byes to the semifinals under the merit-based format. The No. 3 and No. 4 seeds received a single bye to the quarterfinals.

Teams were seeded by record within the division and conference, with a tiebreaker system to seed teams with identical conference records.

Schedule

Bracket

* denotes number of overtime periods

See also
2017 Ohio Valley Conference women's basketball tournament

References

Ohio Valley Conference men's basketball tournament
Basketball competitions in Nashville, Tennessee
Tournament
Ohio Valley Conference men's basketball tournament
Ohio Valley Conference men's basketball tournament
College sports tournaments in Tennessee